José López Silva (1861–1925) was a Spanish playwright.

External links
 

1861 births
1925 deaths
Spanish dramatists and playwrights
Spanish male dramatists and playwrights